The 2001 HaSharon Mall suicide bombing was a suicide bombing which occurred on May 18, 2001 in the HaSharon Mall in Netanya, Israel. Six people were killed in the attack.

The Palestinian Islamist militant organization Hamas said they were responsible for the attack.

The attack
On Friday, May 18, 2001 at 11:30 am, a Palestinian suicide bomber wearing a long blue jacket hiding explosives attached to his body approached the popular HaSharon Mall in the center of Netanya. He was approached by the mall's security guard, who prevented him from entering the mall; the bomber immediately detonated his explosives at the entrance to the mall, killing seven people including himself and injuring more than 50.

Aftermath 
Following the attack Israeli fighter jets attacked Palestinian security forces headquarters in the West Bank, killing 12. The attack marks the first use of Israeli warplanes against Palestinians in the West Bank and Gaza since the 1967 war.

See also 
 HaSharon Mall suicide bombing (December 5, 2005)
 HaSharon Mall suicide bombing (July 12, 2005)

References

External links 
 CNN's Sheila MacVicar describes bomb scene - published on CNN on May 18, 2001
 Israeli jets strike back after bomb - published on The Telegraph on May 19, 2001

Mass murder in 2001
Suicide bombings in 2001
Terrorist incidents in Israel in 2001
May 2001 events in Asia
Hamas suicide bombings
Netanya
Shopping mall bombings
Building bombings in Israel
Islamic terrorism in Israel